Lesley Chimuanya Ugochukwu (born 26 March 2004) is a French professional footballer who plays as a midfielder for  club Stade Rennais.

Career 
Ugochukwu made his professional debut for Rennes on 25 April 2021, replacing Steven Nzonzi in a 5–1 Ligue 1 win against Dijon.

Personal life
Born in France, Ugochukwu is of Nigerian descent. Ugochukwu is the nephew of former Rennes and Nigeria centre-back Onyekachi Apam.

References

External links
 
 

2004 births
Living people
Footballers from Rennes
French footballers
French people of Nigerian descent
Association football midfielders
Stade Rennais F.C. players
Ligue 1 players
Championnat National 3 players
Black French sportspeople
French people of Igbo descent